is a Japanese professional shogi player ranked 5-dan.

Early life 
Hoshino was born in Ageo, Saitama on August 10, 1988. He became interested in shogi when he was about five years old with his first opponent being his mother, and entered the Japan Shogi Association's apprentice school at the rank of 6-kyū under the guidance of shogi professional  in 2001. He was promoted to the rank of apprentice professional 3-dan in 2007, and finally obtained full professional status and the rank of 4-dan in 2014 after tying Hiroshi Miyamoto for first place in the 54th 3-dan League (October 2013March 2014) with a record of 13 wins and 5 losses. Hoshino later stated in a October 2021 interview that his primary motivation for becoming a shogi professional was not money or to have a career, but rather because he felt that "his life would end" and the mental strain would be great if he quit.

Professional shogi player
In September 2008, Hoshino became just the second apprentice professional 3-dan to advance to the finals of  tournament. His bid to become the first apprentice professional to win the tournament, however, was unsuccessful as he lost the 39th Shinjin-Ō title match 2 games to none to regular professional Amahiko Satō 4-dan.

Promotion history
The promotion history for Hoshino is as follows:
6-kyū: September 2001 
3-dan: April 2007 
4-dan: April 1, 2014
5-dan: August 13, 2020

Awards and honors
Hoshino received the Japan Shogi Association's Masuda Award for his "Accelerated Silver 37" variation for the Cheerful Central Rook opening; becoming the second apprentice professional to ever win the award.

Esports shogi professional
In January 2020, Hoshino tweeted that he was looking for ways to supplement career as a professional shogi player. He received an offer from the Japanese software company  and joined the company in April 2020 to take charge of the planning, developing and promoting of its board game products. Hoshino also participated in the tournament with the goal of becoming a Esports shogi professional. Hoshino advanced to the final four tournament held at a shopping mall in Nagoya on October 3, 2021, but ended up in fourth place. He was, however, granted an Esports professional shogi player license by the JeSU for his result.

Notes

References

External links
ShogiHub: Professional Player Info · Hoshino, Yoshitaka
SilverStar Japan Esports professional profile page: Yoshitaka Hoshino 

Japanese shogi players
Living people
Professional shogi players
Professional shogi players from Saitama Prefecture
Recipients of the Kōzō Masuda Award
Japanese esports players
People from Ageo, Saitama
1988 births